Nicholas Robert Cozzarelli (March 26, 1938, in Jersey City, New Jersey – March 19, 2006) was an American biochemist at the University of California, Berkeley, and former editor-in-chief of Proceedings of the National Academy of Sciences.

Education
Cozzarelli attended Princeton University graduated with an A.B. in biology in 1960. He started graduate training at Harvard Medical School advised by E. C. C. Lin and earned a PhD in biochemistry in 1966.

Career and research
Cozzarelli was appointed a postdoctoral researcher with Arthur Kornberg and purified the T4-phage DNA ligase. From 1968 to 1982, Cozzarelli was a professor at the University of Chicago where he studied topoisomerases. In 1982 he joined the faculty at University of California, Berkeley. In 1995, Cozzarelli was named as the editor-in-chief of the Proceedings of the National Academy of Sciences and served in this role from 1995 to 2006. He took the position because he felt that the journal had great unrealized potential. During his tenure, he expanded the editorial board from 26 to more than 140 and created a second track to allow scientists who were not members of the National Academy of Sciences to submit manuscripts directly.

DNA
Francis Crick wrote in his book What Mad Pursuit:

Awards and honors
Cozzarelli was elected a Member of the National Academy of Sciences in 1989. The Cozzarelli Prize is named in his honor.

Death
Cozzarelli died on March 19, 2006, from the complications of treatment from Burkitt's lymphoma.

References

1938 births
2006 deaths
American biochemists
University of California, Berkeley College of Letters and Science faculty
University of Chicago faculty
Members of the United States National Academy of Sciences
People from Jersey City, New Jersey
Princeton University alumni
Harvard Medical School alumni
Deaths from lymphoma
Proceedings of the National Academy of Sciences of the United States of America editors